Forest Hill is a neighborhood in San Francisco, California.  Forest Hill is one of eight master-planned residence parks in San Francisco. Forest Hill is located near the middle of the City of San Francisco, southeast of the Inner Sunset and northeast of West Portal.  Boundaries are roughly Seventh Avenue/Laguna Honda Boulevard to the north and east, Taraval Street to the south, and 14th Avenue to the west.

The area south of Dewey Boulevard is known as Laguna Honda or the Forest Hill Extension. The name Laguna Honda means "deep lagoon" in Spanish and presumably refers to the Laguna Honda Reservoir at the intersection of Laguna Honda Boulevard and Clarendon Avenue.

History
Forest Hill was purchased by a private firm from the heirs of Adolph Sutro. Ground digging to develop the neighborhood began in 1912. Forest Hill was consciously developed to be and openly marketed as a racially exclusive, white-only enclave for economic elites. In the words of promoters who pitched the new neighborhood to potential residents in 1913: "In Forest Hill no property will be sold to Africans or Orientals, and every man who builds a house must build one that is a credit to the property. Forest Hill is only for those people who will build at least $4,000 houses. When a man purchases a home site in Forest Hill he can feel assured that his investment, his home and his family are protected from unsightly buildings and undesirable neighbors."

The streets in Forest Hill were originally built for horse and carriage, making them unusually wide. These streets in Forest Hill did not conform to San Francisco's standards regarding width and grade, and therefore were not initially approved nor maintained by the City until 1978. Landscape architect Mark Daniels developed the master plan for Forest Hill. Several homes and the neighborhood clubhouse were designed by California Arts and Crafts Movement architect Bernard Maybeck. Harold G. Stoner also contributed to the architecture of the area, designing several houses as part of projects for Lang Realty.

See also
List of San Francisco, California Hills

References

External links

 Forest Hill Association

Neighborhoods in San Francisco
Streetcar suburbs
Hills of San Francisco